The Califórnia Building (Portuguese: Edifício e Galeria Califórnia, also Edifício Califórnia) is a mixed-use building in the República district of São Paulo, Brazil. It was designed by the architect Oscar Niemeyer (1907–2012) with Carlos Lemos (born 1925). The building was designed in 1951 and completed in 1955. The Califórnia Building combined a gallery of retail space on its ground floor with residential units above, a theme common to Niemeyer's nearby Copan and Eiffel buildings. It sits on the corner of Barão de Itapetininga and Dom José de Barros avenues.

References

Modernist architecture in Brazil
Oscar Niemeyer buildings
Residential buildings completed in 1955
Residential skyscrapers in Brazil
Retail buildings in Brazil
1955 establishments in Brazil